Jannik Steimle (born 4 April 1996) is a German cyclist, who currently rides for UCI WorldTeam .

In August 2019, Steimle joined UCI WorldTeam  as a stagiaire for the second half of the season. In October 2020, he was named in the startlist for the 2020 Vuelta a España.

Major results

2016
 1st Croatia–Slovenia
2018
 Kreiz Breizh Elites
1st  Mountains classification
1st Stage 2
 3rd Overall Paris–Arras Tour
1st  Young rider classification
 4th Overall Okolo Jižních Čech
1st  Mountains classification
1st Stage 5
 5th GP Izola
 6th Overall Flèche du Sud
1st  Mountains classification
 8th Rund um Köln
2019
 1st  Overall Oberösterreichrundfahrt
1st Stage 1
 1st  Kampioenschap van Vlaanderen
 Tour of Austria
1st Prologue & Stage 5
 1st Stage 4 Flèche du Sud
 3rd Overall CCC Tour - Grody Piastowskie
1st Stage 1a (ITT)
 5th International Rhodes Grand Prix
2020
 1st  Overall Okolo Slovenska
1st Stage 1b (ITT)
2021 
 2nd Overall Okolo Slovenska
1st Stage 2 
2022
 2nd Time trial, National Road Championships
 10th Nokere Koerse

Grand Tour general classification results timeline

References

External links

1996 births
Living people
German male cyclists
People from Esslingen (district)
Sportspeople from Stuttgart (region)
Cyclists from Baden-Württemberg